Pirates of the Caribbean: On Stranger Tides—Original Motion Picture Soundtrack is the soundtrack album to the 2011 eponymous film. Hans Zimmer, who produced Klaus Badelt's score for The Curse of the Black Pearl and composed the music for Dead Man's Chest and At World's End, returned to score the fourth installment of the Pirates franchise. Collaborators included Rodrigo y Gabriela, which are listed as featured artists, and composers Eric Whitacre, Eduardo Cruz and Geoff Zanelli.

Composition
Zimmer said that his music for the series is "making orchestras play rock 'n' roll" as he felt that "pirates were the rock 'n' rollers of many many years ago", and that he decided to add a "Spanish element" to On Stranger Tides.

Many musicians worked with Zimmer in the score. The biggest collaborators were Mexican duo Rodrigo y Gabriela, whose music Zimmer met after being given their album by a friend. Zimmer said they were picked for the soundtrack because the duo "play rock n' roll with flamenco guitars". American composer Eric Whitacre helped with choir-based songs, most notably the mermaid theme, and brought along his soprano wife, Hila Plitmann. Penélope Cruz's brother Eduardo Cruz wrote a tango song, and Geoff Zanelli contributed to many tracks. Trumpetist Arturo Sandoval is featured throughout the score. The music was recorded at the Sony Scoring Stage in Culver City, California, conducted by Nick Glennie-Smith, with Whitacre's choir being done at Abbey Road Studios.

To make the soundtrack album stand out, Zimmer tried to focus on the Rodrigo y Gabriela tracks, as well as providing remixes that "fit the themes". Seven remixes overall are featured. The soundtrack was released on May 17, 2011, three days before the US release of the film.

Track listing

Soundtrack charts

References

External links
 Official site at Walt Disney Records
 Soundtrack analysis at MovieMusic.com

2011 soundtrack albums
Classical music soundtracks
Walt Disney Records soundtracks
Disney film soundtracks
Hans Zimmer soundtracks
On Stranger Tides
Rodrigo y Gabriela albums